Zvonko Breber (born 25 May 1952) is a retired Yugoslav footballer who played as a midfielder.

External links
 
 

1952 births
Living people
Footballers from Zagreb
Yugoslav footballers
Association football midfielders
GNK Dinamo Zagreb players
NK Maribor players
SK Sturm Graz players
Kapfenberger SV players
Yugoslav Second League players
Austrian Football Bundesliga players
NK Maribor managers
Slovenian football managers
Expatriate footballers in Austria
Slovenian expatriate sportspeople in Austria
Slovenian expatriate football managers